Puerto Santander is a town and municipality in the Colombian Department of Amazonas.
The economy relies on fishing, farming and to a lesser extent hunting.

Municipalities of Amazonas Department